Jean-Christophe Marine (age 50, born 5 October 1968) is a Belgian molecular biologist and researcher at CME (Center of Human Genetics) Ku-Leuven (Belgium). He is head of the VIB Laboratory of Molecular Cancer Biology. His research interest is in the identification and characterization of cancer growth modulators, such as p53.

He obtained a PhD from the University of Liège (Liège, Belgium) in 1996. He did a Postdoc at St Jude Children's Research Hospital in Memphis, United States from 1996 until 1999 and at the European Institute of Oncology (IEO) in Milan, Italy from 2000 until 2002. He is VIB Group leader since 2004 and was EMBO Young Investigator in 2006.

References

Sources
https://web.archive.org/web/20100817011029/http://med.kuleuven.be/cme/

Academic staff of KU Leuven
Belgian molecular biologists
University of Liège alumni
Living people
Academic staff of Ghent University
1968 births